Nyberg was the name of a brass era American automobile built by Henry Nyberg of Chicago, Illinois, in Anderson, Indiana, and Chattanooga, Tennessee from 1911 to 1914.

History 
Henry Nyberg was born in 1872 in Hellvi on Gotland island, Sweden. He graduated from the Technical School in Malmo, and emigrated to the United States via Canada shortly thereafter.  He built his first automobile in 1898 and established Nyberg Automobile Works in 1899. He lived in Kenosha, Wisconsin until 1902, and did work for Thomas B. Jeffery Company.

Nyberg Works - Chicago, Illinois 

In 1903, Nyberg moved his workshop to Chicago on East 18th Street.  With an investor named Waller, he built the  Nyberg or Nyberg-Waller single-cylinder runabout automobile and in 1904 moved to a bigger building on South Michigan Avenue, which was also known as Automobile Row. After one season of selling the runabout the business began repairing and selling used cars. In 1907, with a new investor, H. E. Jennings, Nyberg Automobile Works, Inc. was incorporated and moved to a larger building on South Michigan Avenue, with the main business of re-building and re-selling automobiles.

Nyberg Works - Anderson, Indiana 

Henry Nyberg and investors bought the Rider-Lewis automobile factory and equipment in Anderson, Indiana. Consolidated Automobile Company, later changed to Nyberg Automobile Company was the incorporation for the Anderson operations but it continued publicly to be called the Nyberg Automobile Works. The first Nyberg rolled out of the factory on March 30, 1911.

Nyberg's were largely "assembled cars", first offering a four-cylinder touring car and expanding to a six-cylinder car in 1912.  Excelsior and Rutenber engines were used and cars were priced between $1,300 and $2,500,(). Roadsters and Touring cars were the staple product with Limousines available. Nyberg experimented with a fire truck and several other truck products that were not pursued.

The factory built a racing car which Harry Endicott qualified and drove in the 1913 Indianapolis 500. The car finished 21st, retiring due to transmission failure.

Nyberg Works - Chattanooga, Tennessee 
In February of 1912, a manufacturing plant was established and a separate organization of the Nyberg Automobile Works was set up for Chattanooga. It started with capital stock of $150,000 investment by C.E.James, John A. Patten, Z.C. Patten Jr., Henry Nyberg, F.H. Dowler and G. H. Miller. The plant employed 100 workers and expected to produce ten cars a week.

A Chattanooga built Nyberg Six-45 Tourabout ran the July, 1912 Indiana Four-States Tour, which covered a distance of  1,224.8 miles on roads in Ohio, West Virginia, Kentucky, and Indiana.

Underfunded, in 1914 the Anderson and Chattanooga branches went into receivership. Operations ceased in 1914. The two branches were sold to A. C. Barley who was building the Halladay automobile in Streator, Illinois. Production did not resume under Barley and in February 1915 Henry Nyberg purchased the Anderson factory.

Madison Motors Company 

In March of 1915, Henry Nyberg allied himself with Cecil Gibson, who had been associated with the Empire automobile from Indianapolis. They purchased the former Nyberg factory in Anderson to build a new car. Their car, a light six-cylinder with Rutenber engine, would be sold in the $1,500 range. It would initially be called the Dolly (sic) Madison, but by 1916 the partners decided to shorten it to simply Madison.

The Madison Motor Company had been incorporated in 1915 with $500,000 capitalization. In October 1916 it was reorganized as the $2 million Madison Motors Corporation. The venture never received sufficient funding and in the early spring of 1919, Madison Motors was taken over by the Bull Tractor Company.
Henry Nyberg was also associated with the Regal automobile, establishing a plant in Berlin, Ontario, in 1915. Regal's were assembled there until supplies from the Detroit plant ceased in 1917.

See also 
 Rider-Lewis, Nyberg Factory - Historic Structures
 
 Herald-Bulletin Article - 1 Factory 3 Cars by Beth Oljace, 2011
 Herald-Bulletin Article - Several Auto Factories by David Humphrey, 2013

Chattanooga Times Free Press article -Chattanooga's first automobile manufacturer 
The Old Motor- Nyberg a very rare car
The Coker Museum has two Nybergs
Annie Mame - Ann Nyberg - The Nyberg Car

References

Anderson, Indiana
Defunct motor vehicle manufacturers of the United States
Motor vehicle manufacturers based in Indiana
Defunct manufacturing companies based in Indiana
Motor vehicle manufacturers based in Tennessee
Vehicle manufacturing companies established in 1903
Vehicle manufacturing companies disestablished in 1919
Brass Era vehicles
Vintage vehicles
1910s cars
Cars introduced in 1911
Cars introduced in 1915